The Collegium Carolinum (also known as ) was a scientific institution in Kassel, Germany. It was founded in 1709 by Charles I, Landgrave of Hesse-Kassel and closed after the 1785 death of Frederick II, Landgrave of Hesse-Kassel. The Ottoneum housed most of its activities. However, a new anatomical theatre, the first in Germany, was used by Samuel Thomas von Sömmerring.

The Collegium Carolinum was founded as a "new kind of university", where mathematics, the sciences, anatomy and geography should be more important compared to the classical humanist subjects taught at the nearby University of Marburg. In 1766, it was reorganised into a polytechnic by Frederick II and concentrated more on the arts and applicable sciences.

Notable professors 
Georg Forster, naturalist
Johannes von Müller, historian
Johann August Nahl, sculptor
Simon Louis du Ry, architect
Samuel Thomas von Sömmerring, anatomist
Johann Heinrich Tischbein, painter

See also 
Kunsthochschule Kassel

References 

1709 establishments in the Holy Roman Empire
Organisations based in Kassel
Defunct universities and colleges in Germany